The Delaware Journal of Corporate Law is Widener University School of Law's corporate law review. The journal was established in 1976 and publishes three issues per annual volume. In addition to scholarly articles, the journal publishes opinions from the Delaware Court of Chancery that are not otherwise printed in a regional reporter. It ranks among the top specialized legal journals the United States based on the number of citations from federal and state courts. In 2008, the journal ranked 10th out of 411 specialized journals based on citations in state and federal court opinions and 1st among student-edited journals in the category "Corporate Law and Business Law".

Francis G. Pileggi Distinguished Lecture in Law 
The journal hosts the Annual Francis G. Pileggi Distinguished Lecture in Law. This lecture series, held in Wilmington, Delaware, is presented to the Delaware Bench and Bar and focuses on developing issues in the area of corporate law. Notable past Pileggi Lecturers include Ralph K. Winter, Jr. (1986-1987), Louis Loss (1987-1988), Joel Seligman (1997-1998), Lynn A. Stout (2001-2002), Robert B. Thompson (2003-2004), Melvin A. Eisenberg (2004-2005), Stephen Bainbridge (2005-2006), and Mark J. Roe (2007-2008).

Membership selection 
The journal offers three methods for obtaining membership. First, those students whose academic performance has placed them in the top 5% of their respective class after first semester for regular division students or third semester for evening division students are extended invitations to join. Second, students that have completed first-year regular division or second-year evening division may obtain membership through the Summer Writing Competition. This competition takes into consideration both the student’s competition paper and grades. Finally, students, after completion of either second-year regular division or third-year extended division, may submit a paper on a pre-approved topic as part of the Superior Authorship Competition. Participation in this competition is also subject to a minimum GPA requirement.

See also 
 Widener Law Review the law school's general interest publication.

References

External links 
 

American law journals
Widener University
Publications established in 1976
Triannual journals
English-language journals
Law journals edited by students
Business law journals